This is a list of British television related events from 1943.

Events

There are no events for 1943 in British television as broadcasting had been suspended for the duration of the Second World War. This was done amid fears the signals would help German bombers. Television broadcasting resumed in 1946.

Births
 9 January – Freddie Starr, English comedian and singer (died 2019)
 29 January – Tony Blackburn, English radio disc jockey
 2 February – Susan Hanson, English actress
 18 February – Graeme Garden, Scottish writer, comedian and actor
 5 March
 Jane Rossington, English actress
 Hugh Scully, English television presenter (died 2015)
 8 March
 Michael Grade, television executive and businessman
 Lynn Redgrave, English actress (died 2010)
 16 March – John Leeson, British actor
 21 March – Vivian Stanshall, English comedian, writer, artist, broadcaster and musician (died 1995)
 29 March – Eric Idle, English actor, writer and composer
 3 April – Peter Benson, actor (died 2018)
 5 May – Michael Palin, British comedian
 6 May – Grange Calveley, animator and screenwriter (died 2021)
 27 May – Cilla Black, Liverpudlian singer-songwriter and television personality (died 2015)
 8 June – Colin Baker, British actor
 13 June – Malcolm McDowell, actor
 29 June – Maureen O'Brien, British actress
 20 July – Wendy Richard, British actress (died 2009)
 20 August – Sylvester McCoy, British actor
 5 September – Richard Dunn, CEO of Thames Television (died 1998)
 23 September – Tony Gubba, English sports commentator (died 2013)
 30 September – Ian Ogilvy, English actor
 2 October – Anna Ford, journalist, newsreader and television presenter
 11 October – John Nettles, actor
 18 October – Dai Jones, Welsh broadcaster (died 2022)
 23 November – Sue Nicholls, actress
 7 December – Sue Johnston, actor
 19 December – Sam Kelly, actor (died 2014)
 20 December – Jacqueline Pearce, actress (died 2018)
 28 December – Richard Whiteley, English television presenter (died 2005)

See also
 1943 in British music
 1943 in the United Kingdom
 List of British films of 1943